Zoran Stanković (9 November 1954 – 5 October 2021) was a Serbian major-general and politician. He served as the Minister of Defence in the Government of Serbia and the Council of Ministers of Serbia and Montenegro and Minister of Health in the Government of Serbia. His affiliation was independent.

Early life and career
Zoran Stanković was born in the village of Tegovište, Vladičin Han, Yugoslavia. He graduated from the Medicine Faculty at the University of Niš. He finished his Postgraduate Medicine studies at Military Medical Academy in 1997.

Stanković had been a member of the Yugoslav Committee for the Collection of Data on Investigations of Crimes against Humanity and International Law since 1993. In December 1997, he formed a team to investigate the consequences of the NATO bombing of Republika Srpska on suspicion of using depleted uranium missiles. He was a member of the Truth and Reconciliation Commission. He is one of the most respected forensic scientists and pathologists in Serbia, and since 1995 he has worked as a United Nations expert. He testified before the International Criminal Tribunal for the former Yugoslavia in several cases.

He worked as a coroner doctor and became the head manager of Military Medical Academy in 2002. He held this position until 2005 when he was elected to replace Prvoslav Davinić as the new Defense Minister.

Stankovic died from COVID-19 in Belgrade on 5 October 2021, during the COVID-19 pandemic in Serbia. He was 66 years old.

Politics 
In 2005, he was elected a Minister of Defence, and held this position until 2007, when he was replaced by Dragan Šutanovac. He also served as the Minister of Health from 2011 to 2012.

He ran for president at the 2012 Serbian presidential election as the candidate of the United Regions of Serbia, and he finished fifth in the first round with 6.58% of the votes.

In early November 2012, the Government of Serbia appointed him head of the Coordination Body for Bujanovac, Preševo and Medveđa.

Selected works
Stanković, Z., Kovačević, V., Karan, Ž., Milosavljević, I., Tatić, V. (1991) "MORFOLOŠKE KARAKTERISTIKE BLAST POVREDA POGINULIH U OKLOPNIM VOZILIMA“, Vojnosanitetski pregled, Beograd, 48:6, 531-534.
Stanković, Z., Kovačević, V., Domijan, E., Milosavljević, I., Nikolić, M., Nikolić, K., Karan, Ž. (1992) "THE IDENTIFICATION OF CARBONIZED, PUTREFIED, SLAUGHTERED, DECOMPOSED AND FROZEN BODIES“, INTERNATIONAL CONFERENCE AND EXHIBITION ON CRIMINAL INVESTIGATION AND JURISDICTION, Budapest, 10-13.
Stanković, Z. (1992) "SUDSKO - MEDICINSKA OBDUKCIJA U DOKAZIVANJU ZLOČINA“, SANU, Naučni skupovi; knj. 69, Odeljenje istorijskih nauka, knj. 22, Beograd, 363 - 372.
Stanković, Z. (1992) "SUDSKO-MEDICINSKA EKSPERTIZA DVADESET ČETVORO UBIJENIH GRAĐANA IZ GOSPIĆA I OKOLINE“, Vojnosanitetski pregled, Beograd, 49:2,143-169.
Stanković, Z., Kovačević, V., Nikolić, M., Milosavljević, I., Domijan, E., Karan, Ž. (1992) "RAD SUDSKO-MEDICINSKE EKIPE U VUKOVARU“, Dies medicinae forensis, Niš, 6-7 November.
Stanković, Z., Janković, M. (2001), "MRTVI VEČNA OPOMENA ŽIVIMA“, Edicija zbivanja i svedočenja, Bibloteka Matice srpske, Beograd - Pale, 434 str.
Janković, M., Stanković, Z., Jeftić, M., Mikić, Đ.(1995), "ZLOČIN ČEKA KAZNU“, Edicija zbivanja i svedočenja, Biblioteka Matice srpske, Novi Sad, 301 str.
Dimitrijević, J., Stanković, Z., Popović, Z., Kovačević, Z., Škatarić, V., Milosavljević, I., Gligić, A. (2004) "SIGNIFICANCE OF PATHOLOGIC FINDINGS OF HEMORRHAGIC FEVER IN AUTOPSY MATERIAL“, Poster presentation II Intercontinental Congress of pathology, Iguassu Falls, Brazil, 1326, A 06.110, 72.
Stanković, Z. (2000) "EKSPERTIZA MOŠTIJU S PREVLAKE“, Publikacija "Prevlaka Svetog Arhangela Mihaila - Humak Srpske duhovnosti“, Beograd, 99-107.
Kovačević, V., Knežević-Ušaj, S., Milosavljević, I., Stanković, Z., Brđović, J. (1994) "A propos one suicidal dimethoate poisoning“, Arch Toxicol Kinet Xenobiot Metab, Vol 2, No 2, 193.

See also
 Military of Serbia

References

External links 

 ЗОРАН СТАНКОВИЋ, биографија на сајту Криминалистичко-полицијска академија
 125 година Војне болнице у Нишу, Сретен Миленковић, Милорад Димић, Ниш:Војна болница;Зрењанин Југоремедија; Бечеј:Пролетер, 2004(Бечеј Пролетер).116 стр 

1954 births
2021 deaths
People from Vladičin Han
Government ministers of Serbia
Serbia and Montenegro politicians
University of Niš alumni
Candidates for President of Serbia
Defence ministers of Serbia
Deaths from the COVID-19 pandemic in Serbia
Burials at Belgrade New Cemetery